Cubilia is a genus of longhorn beetles of the subfamily Lamiinae, containing the following species:

 Cubilia albosetosa Breuning, 1976
 Cubilia eichelbaumi (Aurivillius, 1910)
 Cubilia fulva Jordan, 1903
 Cubilia heathi Jordan, 1903
 Cubilia nigricans Aurivillius, 1927
 Cubilia obscura Aurivillius, 1925
 Cubilia rufipennis Breuning, 1955
 Cubilia smithi Jordan, 1897

References

Pteropliini